The Honeymoon Race is an American game show that aired on ABC during the daytime from July 17, 1967 to December 1, 1967.

Format
The Honeymoon Race consisted of newlywed couples who competed in a race at Hollywood Mall in Florida. The contestants got from one store to another on golf carts. In early episodes, the couples tried to earn time in a pricing round for a scavenger hunt, with the couple who found the most items in the fastest time winning prizes. This was later changed to a stunt race with the couples won prizes depending on how they finished the race. In either case, each episode consisted of two games with three couples competing in each game.

References

1960s American game shows
1967 American television series debuts
1967 American television series endings
American Broadcasting Company original programming